Sir Peter Stanley Harper  (28 April 1939 – 23 January 2021) was a British physician and academic who was University Research Professor (Emeritus) in Human Genetics at Cardiff University. His work focused on researching neurogenetics and has resulted in discoveries concerning muscular dystrophies and Huntington's disease. He was knighted in 2004 for services to medicine.

Work
Until 2004, Sir Peter was Professor of Medical Genetics at the University of Wales College of Medicine, Cardiff. He helped to develop the All Wales Medical Genomics Service (AWMGS) and has been a member of the UK Human Genetics Commission and Advisory Committee on Genetic testing. He was a member of the Nuffield Council on Bioethics 2004-2010. As a consultant to the History of Modern Biomedicine Research Group, he has contributed to several oral histories which address recent developments in clinical genetics in the UK.

Honours and awards
He delivered the Lumleian Lecture to the Royal College of Physicians in 1995. He was appointed a Commanders of the Order of the British Empire (CBE) in the 1995 Birthday Honours for services to Medical Genetics and was knighted in the 2004 Birthday Honours, for services to Medicine.

Books
 Practical Genetic Counselling, 1998 Hodder Arnold
 Myotonic Dystrophy: The Facts, 2002
 Landmarks in Medical Genetics, 2004 OUP
 First Years of Human Chromosomes, 2006 Scion Press
 A Short History of Medical Genetics, 2008. OUP

References

External links
 Genetics and Medicine Historical Network
 Peter Harper's personal archive and library are held at Special Collections and Archives, Cardiff University.
 

People from Barnstaple
20th-century English medical doctors
Commanders of the Order of the British Empire
Knights Bachelor
Harper
Fellows of the Linnean Society of London
Fellows of the Royal College of Physicians
1939 births
2021 deaths